Janq'u Qullu is a mountain at the border of the provinces of Inquisivi and Loayza, La Paz Department, Bolivia.

Janq'u Qullu (white mountain) may also refer to:

Janq'u Qullu (Oruro), a mountain in the Oruro Department, Bolivia 
Janq'u Qullu (Pando), a mountain in the José Manuel Pando Province, La Paz Department, Bolivia
Janq'u Qullu (Potosí), a mountain in the Potosí Department, Bolivia

See also
Janq'u Qala (disambiguation)